Jonathan A. Drummond (born September 9, 1968) is an American athlete, winner of gold medal in 4 × 100 m relay at the 2000 Summer Olympics.

Career
Born in Philadelphia, Pennsylvania, Jon Drummond is known for being among the world's best starters. He is also well known for what could be called showmanship or taunting depending on one's perspective. Drummond has been called the "Clown Prince" of Track and Field.

His "showmanship" was visible with his membership in the HSI enclave, along with training partners Maurice Greene and Ato Boldon.

In 1991, Drummond won the 200 m at the World University Games. At the 1993 World Championships, Drummond ran the opening leg on the American 4 × 100 m relay team, which won the gold medal and equalled the world record of 37.40. At the 1995 World Championships, he ran the second leg on the American 4 × 100 m relay team, which did not finish its heat after Drummond and Tony McCall failed to complete their pass.

Drummond was the opening leg of the silver medal-winning American 4 × 100 m relay team at the 1996 Summer Olympics and reached the semi-finals of 100 m. In 1997, Drummond won his only US National Championships title in 200 m and at the World Championships, Drummond was seventh in 200 m. In 1999, Drummond suffered a third case of spinal meningitis but managed to recover to run the opening leg in a gold medal-winning American 4 × 100 m relay team at the 1999 World Championships.

At the Sydney Olympics, Drummond was fifth in 100 m and ran again the opening leg on the American 4 × 100 m relay team, which won the gold medal. At the 2001 World Championships, Drummond was again selected to run the first leg in relay, but suffered a torn right quadriceps halfway to passing the baton to Mickey Grimes in the first round and did not run in the final. He did however complete the pass to Grimes in first place allowing the team to continue onto the finals.

In 2002, Drummond was fourth in 100 m and won the 4 × 100 m relay in the IAAF World Cup.

At the 2003 World Championships, he was disqualified in the quarterfinals of 100 m for a false start. However, he contested that he did not false start, repeatedly shouting "I did not move". He delayed competition for almost an hour by refusing to leave the Paris track where the meet was being held. He protested for a period of time by lying down on the track. He eventually left the track of his own volition, reportedly in tears. It is one of a number of cases which relate to the revised false-start policies.

After retirement
At the 2012 London Olympics, Drummond was the relay coach for the U.S. Track Team.  The men's 4x100 metres relay team equalled the existing world record in the Olympics, though were defeated by a new world record by Jamaica.  The women's team won and crushed the world record.  In an event where improvements are normally recorded in hundredths of a second, the team knocked more than a half a second off the record that had stood for more than a quarter of a century.

Drummond worked as a fitness trainer at Daired's Pangea Spa in Arlington, Texas. He also formerly coached sprinter Tyson Gay.

He is also a member of Kappa Alpha Psi fraternity and was formerly a member of Kirk Franklin's gospel group The Family.

He has also followed in his minister father's footsteps as pastor at Noville Memorial Church of God in Christ in Philadelphia.

He was Inducted into the Texas Track and Field Coaches Hall of Fame, Class of 2014.

In 2014, after having tested positive for performance-enhancing drugs, Tyson Gay, Drummond's former athlete, was investigated, leading to the implication that Drummond had "encouraged his use of the banned products and transported them for him." The investigation resulted in an eight-year ban from the sport for Drummond. Drummond was banned until December 16, 2022.

Personal Bests

References

External links
 Jon Drummond at USATF
 
 
 

1968 births
Doping cases in athletics
American sportspeople in doping cases
Living people
Track and field athletes from Philadelphia
African-American male track and field athletes
American male sprinters
Athletes (track and field) at the 1991 Pan American Games
Athletes (track and field) at the 1996 Summer Olympics
Athletes (track and field) at the 2000 Summer Olympics
Olympic gold medalists for the United States in track and field
Olympic silver medalists for the United States in track and field
American track and field coaches
World Athletics Championships medalists
Junior college men's track and field athletes in the United States
Medalists at the 2000 Summer Olympics
Medalists at the 1996 Summer Olympics
Universiade medalists in athletics (track and field)
Goodwill Games medalists in athletics
Universiade gold medalists for the United States
USA Outdoor Track and Field Championships winners
USA Indoor Track and Field Championships winners
World Athletics Championships winners
Medalists at the 1991 Summer Universiade
Competitors at the 1998 Goodwill Games
Competitors at the 1994 Goodwill Games
Pan American Games track and field athletes for the United States
21st-century African-American people
20th-century African-American sportspeople